Laurynas Samėnas (born October 12, 1988) is a Lithuanian professional basketball player.

References

1988 births
Living people
Atomerőmű SE players
BC Juventus players
BC Pieno žvaigždės players
BC Šiauliai players
Lithuanian men's basketball players
Shooting guards